The 58th annual Venice International Film Festival was held between 29 August to 8 September 2001. The opening night film was Dust by Milcho Manchevski (Macedonia/UK/Italy/Germany)

Jury
The following people comprised the 2001 jury:
 Nanni Moretti (head of jury)
 Amitav Ghosh (author)
 Jerzy Skolimowski
 Jeanne Balibar
 Taylor Hackford
 Cecilia Roth
 Vibeke Windeløv
 Francesca Comencini (head of jury) (shorts)
 Jaques Kermabon (critic) (shorts)

Official selection

In competition

Autonomous sections

Venice International Film Critics' Week
The following feature films were selected to be screened as In Competition for this section:
 Gege (Brother) by Yan Yan Mak (Hong Kong)
 Rain by Katherine Lindberg (United States)
 Rasganço by Raquel Freire (Portugal, France)
 An Adolescent (Shōjo) by Eiji Okuda (Japan)
 Sailing Home (Tornando a casa) by Vincenzo Marra (Italy)
 A Moment of Happiness (Un moment de bonheur) by Antoine Santana (France)
 Smokers Only (Vagón fumador) by Verónica Chen (Argentina)

Awards
 Golden Lion:
 Monsoon Wedding (Mira Nair)
Grand Special Jury Prize:
Dog Days (Ulrich Seidl)
Silver Lion:
Secret Ballot (Babak Payami)
Volpi Cup:
Best Actor: Luigi Lo Cascio Light of My Eyes
Best Actress: Sandra Ceccarelli Light of My Eyes
Marcello Mastroianni Award:
And Your Mother Too (Gael García Bernal and Diego Luna)
Luigi De Laurentiis Award:
Kruh in mleko (Jan Cvitkovic and Danijel Hocevar)
Cinema of the Present - Lion of the Year:
Seafood (Wen Zhu)
Cinema of the Present - Special Jury Award:
Le Souffle (Damien Odoul)
FIPRESCI Prize:
Competition: Wild Innocence (Philippe Garrel)
Parallel Sections: Le Souffle (Damien Odoul)
OCIC Award:
Secret Ballot (Babak Payami)
Netpac Award:
Secret Ballot (Babak Payami)
Quitting (Yang Zhang)
Don Quixote Award:
L'emploi du temps (Laurent Cantet)
UNICEF Award:
Secret Ballot (Babak Payami)
UNESCO Award:
Porto of My Childhood (Manoel de Oliveira)
Pasinetti Award:
Best Film: Secret Ballot (Babak Payami)
Best Actor: (Luigi Lo Cascio) Light of My Eyes
Best Actress: (Sandra Ceccarelli) Light of My Eyes
Italian Cinema Clubs Awards:
Sailing Home (Vincenzo Marra)
Pietro Bianchi Award:
Alberto Sordi
Isvema Award:
Sailing Home (Vincenzo Marra)
FEDIC Award:
Sailing Home (Vincenzo Marra)
Wella Prize:
Red Moon (Licia Maglietta)
Elvira Notari Prize:
Fish and Elephant (Yu Li)
Cult Network Italia Prize:
Sailing Home (Vincenzo Marra)
FilmCritica "Bastone Bianco" Award:
Dias de Nietzsche em Turim (Júlio Bressane)
Future Film Festival Digital Award:
A.I. Artificial Intelligence (Steven Spielberg)
Laterna Magica Prize:
Monsoon Wedding (Mira Nair)
Sergio Trasatti Award:
Light of My Eyes (Giuseppe Piccioni)
CinemAvvenire Award:
Best Film on the Relationship Man-Nature: Sailing Home (Vincenzo Marra)
Best Film: Waking Life (Richard Linklater)
Best First Film: Ggot seom (Il-gon Song)
Children and Cinema Award:
The Navigators (Ken Loach)
Rota Soundtrack Award:
The Navigators (George Fenton)
Mimmo Rotella Foundation Award:
Quem És Tu? (João Botelho)
Special Director's Award:
Babak Payami
Best Screenplay:
And Your Mother Too (Alfonso Cuarón and Carlos Cuarón)

References

External links 

Venice Film Festival 2001 Awards on IMDb

Venice
Venice
V
Venice Film Festival
Film
August 2001 events in Europe
September 2001 events in Europe